Endra Prasetya (born 1 May 1981) is an Indonesian former footballer who plays as a goalkeeper.

International career

National team

Honours

Club honours
Persebaya Surabaya
 Liga Indonesia First Division (1): 2003
 Liga Indonesia Premier Division (1): 2004

External links 
  

Indonesian footballers
Living people
1981 births
People from Madiun
Indonesia international footballers
Liga 1 (Indonesia) players
Indonesian Premier League players
Persebaya Surabaya players
Persela Lamongan players
Persema Malang players
Borneo F.C. players
Bali United F.C. players
Association football goalkeepers
Sportspeople from East Java